In geometry, the small hexacronic icositetrahedron is the dual of the small cubicuboctahedron. It is visually identical to the small rhombihexacron. A part of each dart lies inside the solid, hence is invisible in solid models.

Proportions 
Its dihedral angles equal . The ratio between the lengths of the long edges and the short ones equals .

References

External links
 
Dual uniform polyhedra